AC-5 may refer to:
 Altair Coelho AC-5, a speedster airplane
 Aviastroitel AC-5, glider
 , a US Navy collier active during World War I
 Southern Pacific class AC-5, a class of steam locomotive
 AC-5, an IEC Utilization Category